Mauritius competed at the 2004 Summer Olympics in Athens, Greece, from 13 to 29 August 2004. This was the nation's sixth consecutive appearance at the Olympics.

Mauritius Olympic Committee sent the nation's smallest delegation to the Games since the 1988 Summer Olympics in Seoul. A total of nine athletes, six men and three women, competed only five different sports. Boxer Michael Medor was the nation's flag bearer in the opening ceremony. There was only a single competitor in archery, boxing, and weightlifting.

Mauritius, however, has yet to win its first ever Olympic medal. Sprinter Stephane Buckland set the nation's historical milestone as the first Mauritian athlete to reach an Olympic final with a prospect of bringing home a medal for the team, but managed only to finish strongly in sixth place.

Archery

One Mauritian archer qualified each for the men's individual archery through a tripartite invitation.

Men

Athletics

Mauritian athletes have so far achieved qualifying standards in the following athletics events (up to a maximum of 3 athletes in each event at the 'A' Standard, and 1 at the 'B' Standard).

Men
Track & road events

Field events

Women
Track & road events

Key
Note–Ranks given for track events are within the athlete's heat only
Q = Qualified for the next round
q = Qualified for the next round as a fastest loser or, in field events, by position without achieving the qualifying target
NR = National record
N/A = Round not applicable for the event
Bye = Athlete not required to compete in round

Boxing

Mauritius sent a single boxer to Athens.

Swimming

Men

Women

Weightlifting

Mauritius has qualified a single weightlifter.

See also
 Mauritius at the 2004 Summer Paralympics

References

External links
Official Report of the XXVIII Olympiad

Nations at the 2004 Summer Olympics
2004
Olympics